Poecilosoma is a genus of moths in the subfamily Arctiinae The genus was erected by Jacob Hübner in 1819.

Species
 Poecilosoma annulatum Draudt, 1915
 Poecilosoma chrysis Hübner, 1823
 Poecilosoma eone (Hübner, 1824)
 Poecilosoma eusebia (Druce, 1883)
 Poecilosoma mapirense Strand, 1915
 Poecilosoma marginatum (Walker, 1856)
 Poecilosoma misionum Strand, 1915
 Poecilosoma nigerrima (Walker, 1865)
 Poecilosoma vespoides Schaus, 1905

References

Arctiinae
Taxa named by Jacob Hübner